Runaway is a 1995 South Korean action thriller film.

Plot
Lee Dong-ho, a computer games producer, and Choi Miran, a freelance illustrator meet by chance and spend a short but passionate night together. But just when they are about to go back to their ordinary lives, they witness a shocking murder. This is followed by mysterious happenings that destroy everything that they cherish in their lives. A police officer turns out to be a kidnapper and hired killers break into their homes. In front of their eyes, they lose their loved ones. Nobody is of much help to them. At home, in the police station, in the hospital, at work, wherever they go, criminals seem to follow them. Finally, they must face the real criminals.

Cast
Lee Byung-hun ... Lee Dong-ho
Lee Geung-young
Kim Eun-jeong ... Choi Miran
Jang Se-jin ...  Wolf
Jang Dong-jik
Lee Cheol-ung
Kim Ki-hyeon
Lee Seok-jun
Kim Dong-geon
Lee Eun-Young

See also
Date Night (2008)

External links
 
 

1995 action thriller films
1995 films
South Korean action thriller films
1990s Korean-language films